Briggs Township is a geographic township comprising a portion of the municipality of Temagami in Northeastern Ontario, Canada. It is used for geographic purposes, such as land surveying and natural resource explorations. Neighbouring geographic townships include Chambers Township, Joan Township and Strathcona Township.

Notes

References

Townships of Temagami